Life & Style is an American syndicated talk show that was geared toward young adult females. It was produced and distributed by Sony Pictures Television and lasted only one season, from September 2004 to March 2005. It is unrelated to the celebrity magazine of the same name, also launched in 2004.

Background
The hour-long program was hosted by Jules Asner, Kimora Lee Simmons, Cynthia Garrett, and Lynne Koplitz. A cutesy ad campaign gave all four co-hosts corresponding adjectives. Jules was "stylish and sophisticated", Cynthia was "smart and single mom", Lynne was "frank and funny" and Kimora was "outspoken and outrageous."

It was also intended to be an alternative to The View and to a certain extent fill the void left by Ricki Lake after she passed on doing a twelfth season. Like The View, this program in particular offered lifestyle tips and topics ranging from fashion ideas to relationship advice, but at the same time tried to target a young urban audience that worked successfully during Lake'''s tenure.

Unfortunately, the concept and difficult time slots in various markets, along with former Lake viewers having moved on to other offerings in syndication as well as airing the show on Oxygen, would take its toll on the program, resulting in Sony canceling Life & Style in March 2005.

Controversy would also contribute to the program's demise as well. In the Page Six article of the New York Post, it was reported that Kimora Lee Simmons was difficult to work with, including one incident in which Simmons individually licked every doughnut on the catering table as so no one else could eat them. Simmons later told Vanity Fair'' of making the show, "I wasn't used to having a boss."

Production notes
The series was nominated for Outstanding achievement in Main Title Design in the 2005 Daytime Emmy Awards.

References

External links
 

Fashion-themed television series
2004 American television series debuts
2005 American television series endings
2000s American television talk shows
Television series by Sony Pictures Television
Television shows set in New York City
First-run syndicated television programs in the United States